Dennison Wheelock (June 14, 1871 – March 10, 1927) was an Oneida band conductor, composer, and cornet soloist of the late 19th and early 20th centuries. Wheelock was compared to prominent bandleader John Philip Sousa, and nominated to be bandmaster of the United States Marine Band. At the age of 40 he became an American Indian rights activist and attorney, and within several years was arguing cases for Indian nations at the United States Court of Claims and US Supreme Court.

Wheelock was born in the Oneida Nation of Wisconsin. He went to Pennsylvania to be educated at the Carlisle Indian School, returning later for study at Dickinson Preparatory School. Wheelock was appointed as the first Oneida bandmaster of the internationally acclaimed Carlisle Indian School Band, which performed at world fairs, expositions, and presidential inaugurals. While at the school, he composed the Sousa-inspired "Carlisle Indian School March." In 1900 he debuted his three-part symphony, Aboriginal Suite, at Carnegie Hall in New York City.

In 1911 Wheelock was among the 50 founding members of the Society of American Indians, the first national American Indian rights organization developed and run by American Indians. He had read the law and passed the bar that year, practicing first in Wisconsin. As he represented more Indian nations in his practice, he moved to Washington, D.C., where he represented them in actions against the government in the United States Court of Claims and the U.S. Supreme Court. In 1980, to honor him and the celebrated Carlisle Indian Band, Dennison Wheelock's Bandstand was reconstructed on the site of the original at the U.S. Army War College in Carlisle, Pennsylvania.

Early life

Dennison Wheelock was born June 14, 1871, in the Oneida Nation of Wisconsin, second child of James A. Wheelock and Sophia Doxtator. He had an older brother Charles and a total of eight other brothers and sisters, and half-siblings. Dennison grew up in the 1870s and early 1880s in a poor Oneida farm community, which was faced with increasing economic pressures to harvest its timber and a federal push for the allotment of tribal lands to individual households. The Nation struggled with high alcohol consumption and tribal infighting. Dennison took up the cornet after hearing his older brother, Charles, playing it. He was impressed by a visiting Tuscarora musician, who taught the youth music reading and simple composition for several months. In 1879, Seneca and Tuscarora musicians won medals of excellence at state fairs. Dennison also heard the popular band music of John Philip Sousa at Wisconsin fairs. Locally, the Oneida Union Band and the Oneida National Band were prominent in community events and throughout the Midwest.

Carlisle Indian School

For more than 100 years, numerous Iroquois children, including Oneida, had been sent away from home to Christian schools for education. It was a tradition Wheelock likely heard about. Moor's Indian Charity School, now Dartmouth College, was founded in 1755 by Eleazar Wheelock, a Puritan minister. He established the school to train Native Americans as missionaries. Dennison's surname was adopted by an Oneida ancestor as a tribute to Wheelock.Hamilton-Oneida Academy, now Hamilton College, was a seminary founded in 1793 by Presbyterian Samuel Kirkland as part of his missionary work with the Oneida in New York State, their traditional territory.

The Oneida people from Wisconsin and New York constituted one of the largest Indian nation's contingents at Carlisle Indian School. Only the Lakota, Chippewa and Seneca had more students enrolled. Between 1885 and 1917, more than 500 Oneida students attended Carlisle.

In January 1884 at age 13, Wheelock wrote to Captain Richard Henry Pratt, Superintendent of the Carlisle Indian School, referring to his "limited musical education" and his musical awakening. In 1885, Wheelock enrolled in the Carlisle Indian School to study under Pratt. Dennison excelled in the classroom, and as a champion debater; he also was a fine tenor in the choir and cornetist extraordinaire in the band. In June 1890, Dennison graduated from Carlisle.

He returned to Oneida, Wisconsin, where he started teaching and was appointed as a justice of the peace.  But within a year, Wheelock returned to Carlisle. With Pratt's recommendation, he enrolled in the nearby Dickinson Preparatory School. Dickinson College provided Carlisle Indian students with access to college-level education through the Dickinson Preparatory School ("Conway Hall"). Only a select few of Carlisle students were recommended to this institution. Dennison attended Dickinson Preparatory school from 1891 to 1892.

In 1892, Pratt appointed Wheelock as assistant clerk, working directly for him at the School.  Later that year, Pratt appointed the young man as bandmaster, a position he would hold for more than eight years, until 1900.

Music at Carlisle
During the Progressive Era, from the late 19th century until the onset of World War I, Native American performers were major draws and money-makers. Millions of visitors at world fairs, exhibitions, and parades throughout the United States and Europe saw Native Americans portrayed as the vanishing race, exotic peoples, and objects of modern comparative anthropology. Reformers and Progressives fought a war of words and images against the popular Wild West shows at world fairs, expositions and parades. They opposed theatrical portrayals of Wild Westers as vulgar heathen stereotypes. In contrast, Carlisle students were portrayed as a new generation of Native American leadership embracing civilization, education and industry.

Music was an important part of the Carlisle curriculum. Every student took music classes, and many received private instruction.

Development of the music program at Carlisle was supported largely by private philanthropy, rather than federal funds. Around 1879, a visiting philanthropist from Boston reported hearing "tom-toms" and Indian singing in the dormitories. Pratt preferred that the "tom-toms" stopped, but said,

It wouldn't be fair to do unless I can give them something else as good, or better, on the same line. If you will give me a set of brass instruments, I will give them to the "tom-tom boys" and they can toot on them, and this will stop the "tom-tom."

Pratt soon received a set of musical instruments: cornets, clarinets, and pianos from Boston. 
 
While classical European music was emphasized at Carlisle, the students also sang and drummed traditional tribal music in their dormitories. They played samples of such music at assembly and local community programs. Later, Wheelock featured American Indian music with classical European music in his opera, Aboriginal Suite.

Carlisle Indian Band

Pratt established the Carlisle Indian School band in 1880. By the time Wheelock entered the school in the mid-1880s, musical programs were a common feature of the school.  Band members mastered Greig, Mozart, Rossini, Schubert and Wagner. They frequently performed at school assemblies, holiday festivities and at the Carlisle Opera House, delighting the students, teachers and administrators at the school and gaining favorable attention among the local white townspeople.
In 1892, Dennison was appointed bandmaster of the Carlisle Indian Band, a position he would hold for over eight years, until 1900. Wheelock was the first American Indian bandmaster at Carlisle. After his tenure, his brother James took up the baton.  Under the leadership of Dennison Wheelock and James Wheelock, the Carlisle Indian Band earned an international reputation of musical excellence. The Carlisle Indian Band performed at world fairs, expositions, concert venues and at every national presidential inaugural celebration until the school closed. Taking over the reins of the Carlisle Indian School Band, he recruited new members. Dennison continued to perform at as a solo cornetist and his younger brother James, a student at the school, became a fixture on the "E-Clarinet. "  Wheelock's commitment to music extended beyond the classroom and the bandstand the Carlisle. Throughout the 1890s, he was also composing songs, popular "fluff", band music, as well as the symphony, which he finally completed in 1900.

By 1894, the band and the Carlisle Women's Choir, performed throughout the East. On April 15, 1894, The New York Times did a feature on Wheelock with his portrait and band, reviewing their performance at the city's Lenox Lyceum. The review noted "few metropolitan bands can boast of greater care and accuracy in the execution of their music." "Among other offerings, the band played Mozart and Wagner as well as two selections compose by Wheelock himself: "The Carlisle Indian School March" and a piece entitled "American Medley." "The concert's patrons read as a "Who's Who" of New York's elite families, including Mrs. J. Pierpont Morgan, Mrs. Russell Sage, Mrs. James Harriman and Mrs. Elihu Root.

Marriage
Louise LaChapelle (Wheelock), a Chippewa from the White Earth Reservation in northwestern Minnesota, arrived as a student at Carlisle two years earlier than Dennison.  They met, courted, married and had four children.  Richard Edmund Wheelock, Paul Wheelock, Leeland Lloyd Wheelock  and Louise Frances Wheelock. Their first two children were born in Carlisle.

Captain Richard Henry Pratt
Captain Pratt was Dennison's mentor and school father, and Carlisle, Pennsylvania, was Dennison's second-home. Wheelock corresponded with Pratt for over 35 years and confided in each other throughout their lives. Wheelock had affection for Pratt, his wife and Carlisle. Wheelock shared Pratt's views.  Both saw federal Indian boarding schools as a temporary educational formula to "uplift" the Indians, and called for the abolishment of Indian reservations and the Bureau of Indian Affairs.  They focused upon the release of Indians from federal control, full citizenship, equal opportunity and education in public schools. Wheelock and Pratt had little faith in the efficacy of the Society of American Indians to make real changes, since they believed that the organization had too many BIA bureaucrats, naïve reformers from the Indian Rights Association another "paper shooters."  From 1921 to 1922, Captain Pratt lobbied President Warren G. Harding to nominate Wheelock to be Commissioner of Indian affairs.

James Riley Wheelock

Under the leadership of Dennison Wheelock and James Wheelock, the Carlisle Indian Band earned an international reputation of musical excellence.  James Riley Wheelock was a younger brother of bandmaster Dennison Wheelock and graduated from Carlisle in 1896. Like Dennis, James attended the prestigious Dickinson College Preparatory School after completing his Carlisle studies. When Dennison resigned as Bandmaster in 1900, James succeeded him. In 1903, James studied music and his specialty, clarinet, in Leipzig, Germany.

In 1909, James clashed with Superintendent Moses Friedman, Pratt's successor. Wheelock recruited Carlisle students to tour with his professional band during the summer, believing the experience would fit into the parameters of Carlisle's outing program.  Superintendent Friedman refused, but several boys from the band attempted join Wheelock's band and had their trunks taken to the train depot. Friedman discovered the plan and the boys were locked in the guardhouse as punishment for their actions. The rest of the Carlisle Band was so resentful at these measures, they refused to perform during that evening's "salute to the flag, " a daily ritual at Carlisle. James was infuriated by Friedman's actions and charged in newspapers that the Superintendent was jealous of his band's success, was the cause of disciplinary problems at the school and that the students were illegally held in a "dungeon." Friedman responded that he had refused permission because in the past, "students indulged in the kind of dissipation and debauchery during the summer which taints and brings about an unhealthy condition in the fall when they return to school." The story made local headlines and embarrassed both Carlisle and the Office of Indian Affairs.  After several weeks and an official investigation, the matter was dropped. The students who forged resistance through the flag controversy rebelled because of their intense desire to perform beyond the campus.

In 1914, the Harrisburg Telegraph reported that James Riley Wheelock, director of the Enola Band, was performing in clarinet solos and was one of the best clarinet players in Pennsylvania. During World War I, Wheelock was commissioned as a Second Lieutenant in the U.S. Army, where he conducted a black regimental band.  After the war, he conducted the famous U.S. Indian Band and others well into the 1920s.

Wheelocks at Carlisle
The Wheelocks were likely the first family of Carlisle Indian School, because there were so many of them, and they were mentioned prominently in Carlisle publications.
The Oneida people from Wisconsin and New York was one of the largest contingents of Indians at Carlisle, and only the Lakota, Chippewas and Senecas had more students. Between 1885 and 1917, over five hundred  Oneida students attended Carlisle. Of Wheelock's nine brothers, half-brothers, sisters and half sisters, only two-his oldest brother Charles, who also played the cornet, and his youngest half-brother, Harrison did not attend.  In addition, several of his first and second cousins were enrolled at the school. Dennison's younger brothers Hugh Wheelock and Joel Wheelock, who attended Carlisle, were also accomplished musicians, and later directed their own all-Indian bands. Sister Ida Wheelock was active in school organizations such as the Susan Longstreth Literary Society, and Martin Frederick Wheelock, a cousin of Dennison, played American football for the Carlisle Indians from 1894 to 1902.

In August 1914,  Dennison wrote Oscar Lipps, Acting Superintendent at Carlisle: "My sister, Martha Wheelock, aged twenty years, whose term expired at Flandreau, South Dakota last June, and is now with me in West De Pere, desires to be admitted to the Carlisle Indian School as a pupil. I am very anxious that she shall go if possible. She is in eighth grade. My son, Edmund is also very anxious to have the benefit of a diploma from Carlisle on account of the prestige it carries with it throughout the West." Edmund, who was born in at the Carlisle Indian School in 1896, had been attending public school in Wisconsin and doing well, but Dennison was concerned about the environment. "Unfortunately, however, De Pere is a city of less than five thousand inhabitants, yet has in the neighborhood of twenty-two, or twenty-four saloons, and on account of what is falsely termed liberal sentiment, the saloon keepers do not hold strictly to the law of the land, and as a result we see young boys very frequently under the influence of liquor." Within a month, both Edmund and Martha were attending Carlisle and active in school life and literary societies.

International fame

Carlisle Indian Band
  

In the early years of the 20th century, Wheelock was compared to John Philip Sousa, and even nominated to be his successor as bandmaster of United States Marine Band. Wheelock relished Sousa's music, known for American march music.

On October 10, 1892, the 400th anniversary of Columbus landing in the New World, Wheelock's thirty-one piece Carlisle Indian Band, along with 300 Carlisle boys and girls, marched on Fifth Avenue in New York City past Washington Square. The nation's newspapers praised the boys and girls for their "intelligent faces and dignified bearing."   "But the one that caught the crowd was the Indian band that had the delegation from Carlisle. With the smoothest harmony and in most perfect time, this band played a marching anthem as it passed the reviewing stand. Both the melody and spectacle or so when usual that the people rose to their feet and cheered again and again. The Indian boys marched with perfect step, and they came opposite President Benjamin Harrison's stand with the military precision that no pale faced organization equaled."

In 1893, by the time the Carlisle contingent reached Chicago for the beginning of the Columbian Exposition, newspapers nationwide reported about Pratt and his Carlisle Indian students. Upon his return to Carlisle, Wheelock began a nationwide effort to recruit for Carlisle the most promising young Indian musicians from other boarding schools for the best talent.  He also started to teach music, now being referred to as "Professor. " 
 In 1894, Wheelock along with the Carlisle Women's Choir performed throughout the East. In 1896, Wheelock published the Carlisle Indian School March.  Also, he presented a composition From Savagery to Civilization for the 17th anniversary celebration of the founding of Carlisle. Dennison performed as a soloist with the band, and the schools newspaper reported that the "sounds produced led up from the wild tom-tom, to curious and intricate twists and turns to the sweet and classic streams of civilized horns."  The composition was a prelude to Dennison's Aboriginal Suite, which he debuted in 1900 at Carnegie Hall.

The Aboriginal Suite
 
In 1897, Wheelock traveled around the country recruiting musicians for a 70-piece, all-Indian student band to expand the Carlisle Indian Band as a new U.S. Indian Band. During this time, he completed his Aboriginal Suite, a full symphony in three parts: "Morning on the Plains", "The Lovers Song" and "Dance of the Red Men."  Wheelock planned to perform this symphony at the Paris Exposition of 1900 and the Pan-American Exposition of 1901 in Buffalo, New York. Wheelock was thought to be influenced by the music of European composer Edvard Grieg.
 
On March 28, 1900, Wheelock and the U.S. Indian Band performed his Aboriginal Suite at Carnegie Hall, a prestigious venue in New York City. A reviewer for Metronome reported that the concert was part of "a series being given by the organization prior to its departure for Paris, where it will demonstrate a new development in Indian civilization." The band also played selections from Gounod's opera Faust (opera) and Meyerbeer's The Huguenots. The response to the concert was overwhelmingly positive: "A large and genuinely enthusiastic audience greeted the reservation musicians, forcing them to respond to repeated encores."

Wheelock said in an interview,

The original Indian music is a strange thing. It is devoid of harmony, but the melody and time are there, and it is easily harmonized. Some great critics say that our aboriginal music is the same as played by all primitive people world over. Chinese music itself is built on the same principle and I am planning out the composition called the evolution of music. I hope to show the growth of harmony. First, so many musicians will come out in Indian costume, play some primitive melody. Others will follow playing something more advanced, and so on until the whole band is on stage and we are rendering the best grand opera.

Six weeks later, Wheelock's 10-month-old son Paul died in Carlisle. he and Louise were grief-stricken, and the school canceled the band's appearance in Paris.  In tribute to Wheelock, the National Band of France played the Aboriginal Suite for him.

Haskell Indian School
In 1900, after his son died at Carlisle, Wheelock resigned his post to move his career elsewhere.  He worked as a newspaperman in Green Bay, Wisconsin, and then a disciplinarian at the U.S. Indian School at Flandreau, South Dakota. Wheelock performed as guest bandmaster at Willow Grove Park, near Philadelphia, Pennsylvania. This premier venue featured Sousa and his band at the music pavilion every year but one between 1901 and 1926. On one occasion, Wheelock drew 70,000 people to a concert. He was later awarded a gold medal and a silver cup for his brilliant conducting.

In 1903, Wheelock was appointed bandmaster of Haskell Indian School in Lawrence, Kansas, where his efforts were nationally acclaimed.  In March 1904, a review in Metronome called the band an "up-to-date aggregation of capable musicians trained in every respect for high-class concert work." "Besides performing "their own quaint Indian songs they played Gounod, Mendelssohn, Mozart and Wagner".

In 1904, Wheelock's Haskell Indian Band performed at the Louisiana Purchase Exposition, known as the St. Louis World's Fair. The band performed a mixture of classical and popular music, and Wheelock's Aboriginal Suite. This included Native dances and war whoops by band members.  The Carlisle Indian Band also performed at the Pennsylvania state pavilion.

That year Captain Pratt was forced out of his post as superintendent at Carlisle by BIA officials. His network of philanthropists stopped donating to American Indian music, and Wheelock faced a financial struggle. He was supporting an aging father, numerous siblings, wife and son. He resigned from Haskell to seek better-paying employment.

Society of American Indians

 
Wheelock was among the 50 founders in 1911 of the Society of American Indians (1911-1923), the first national American Indian rights organization developed and run by American Indians. The Society pioneered 20th-century Pan-Indianism, the philosophy and movement promoting unity among American Indians regardless of tribal affiliation. The Society was a forum for a new generation of American Indian leaders known as Red Progressives: they were mostly prominent professionals from the fields of medicine, nursing, law, government, education, anthropology, ethnology and ministry. They shared an enthusiasm and faith in the inevitability of progress through education and governmental action. The Society met at academic institutions, maintained a Washington headquarters, conducted annual conferences, and published a quarterly journal of literature by American Indian authors. The Society promoted an "American Indian Day", and led the fight for Indians to have United States citizenship. It lobbied to have U.S. Court of Claims available to hear cases of all tribes and bands in United States.

The Society of American Indians was the forerunner of modern organizations such as the National Congress of American Indians. It anticipated important Indian reforms: a major reorganization of the Indian school system in the late 1920s, the codification of Indian law in the 1930s, and the opening of the U.S. Court of Claims to all Indian nations in the 1940s.

Petition to President Woodrow Wilson
In October 1914, Wheelock hosted the society's 1914 annual convention in Madison, Wisconsin. In December 1914, the society met in Washington, D.C., where its members received a first-class reception from the federal government. Commissioner of Indian Affairs Cato Sells welcomed them to the nation's capital, where they toured the Bureau of Indian Affairs. He arranged for a visit to the White House to meet with President Woodrow Wilson.

Wheelock presented the president with the society's petition asking for appointment of a three-member commission to gain US citizenship for American Indians, and for broadening jurisdiction of the U.S. Court of Claims so that it could hear all Indian nation claims against the United States. He said to Wilson, "We believe that you feel, with the progressive members of your race, that it is anomalous permanently to conserve within the nation groups of people whose civic condition by legislation is different from the normal standard of American life." The outbreak of World War I impeded federal enactment of remedial Indian legislation.

As an attorney, Wheelock later represented Indian nations before the U.S. Court of Claims and the U.S. Supreme Court.

Law career

In 1910, Wheelock decided to go into law. He took up the study of law by returning to Carlisle, Pennsylvania, where he had a wide professional network. He "reading the law" as an apprentice at the office of John Miller, head of the Cumberland County Bar Association. He served as a legal apprentice to Miller.

In 1911, after completing his training, Wheelock returned to Wisconsin, and completed requirements to be admitted to the Bar. He established his residence and practice in De Pere, near the Oneida Nation of Wisconsin. Wheelock became one of the most successful attorneys in Brown and Outagamie counties. He represented both Indian and non-Indian clients, although in this period, anti-Indian sentiments were rising in North Central Wisconsin. In 1915, Dennison also led the Green Bay Concert Band, which was composed largely of non-Indian musicians.

During the next decade, Wheelock expanded his practice well beyond Wisconsin. By 1923, he was specializing in representing tribal nations, ranging across the country from those in Washington State to New York, including the Nisqually, Menominee, Mohawk, and Stockbridge-Munsee Band. As he was increasingly representing these nations in claims and actions related to the federal government, he moved his law practice to Washington, D.C. There he argued appellate cases before the US Supreme Court and the US Court of Claims.

Later years
In 1921, Wheelock served as general manager and bandmaster of the Oneida Indian Centennial Celebration, commemorating the 100th anniversary of the tribe's migration to Wisconsin.  His band performed Bizet's Carmen and Western classics. The American Indian nations of Wisconsin set up a traditional-style village, where they sold traditional baskets and other crafts, as well as Indian foods. A special grandstand was used for Indians to perform and celebrate Menominee and Oneida music and dancing.

Wheelock continued his practice in Washington, DC until his death on March 10, 1927, at the age of 56. He was buried in a Masonic funeral at Woodlawn Cemetery, Brown County, Wisconsin. His wife Louise LaChapelle Wheelock died on January 16, 1931. She was buried next to him.

Legacy and honors

In 1980, Dennison Wheelock's Bandstand was reconstructed on the site of the original at the U.S. Army War College, Carlisle, Pennsylvania. The Carlisle Barracks complex was designated a National Historic Landmark (NHL) in 1961 because of its significant history and many uses.
On August 14, 2003, the Green Bay Concert Band played Wheelock's Aboriginal Suite at the Oneida Nation of Wisconsin. The symphony had not been performed in more than 75 years.

Sousa on the Rez

Sousa on the Rez: Marching to the Beat of a Different Drum is a half-hour documentary that explores the vibrant but little known tradition of brass band music in Indian country. The phrase "Native American music" may not suggest tubas and trumpets to many outsiders but, popularized by the Wheelock brothers, march music by composers such as John Philip Sousa has been adopted and played by Native American cultures for more than a century.

References

Further reading 
 Troutman, John William, "Indian Blues: American Indians and the Politics of Music 1879–1934", University of Oklahoma Press, 2009.

External links
 Band and Battalion of the U.S. Indian School, (1901), a silent film documentary, was made by  American Mutoscope and Biograph Company at the Carlisle Indian School. The cinematographer Arthur Marvin features a mass-band parade drill, led by the renowned Carlisle Band.
 
 

1871 births
1927 deaths
People from Brown County, Wisconsin
Oneida people
American male composers
American composers
Native American composers
Native American activists
Members of the Society of American Indians
Carlisle Indian Industrial School alumni
People from Carlisle, Pennsylvania
Musicians from Wisconsin
Lawyers from Washington, D.C.
Wisconsin lawyers
People from Oneida, Wisconsin
19th-century American lawyers